John Harris Harbison (born December 20, 1938) is an American composer, known for his symphonies, operas, and large choral works.

Life
John Harris Harbison was born on December 20, 1938, in Orange, New Jersey, to the historian Elmore Harris Harbison and Janet German Harbison. The Harbisons were a musical family; Elmore had studied composition in his youth and Janet wrote songs. Harbison's sisters Helen and Margaret were musicians as well. He won the prestigious BMI Foundation's Student Composer Awards for composition at the age of 16 in 1954. He studied music at Harvard University (BA 1960), where he sang with the Harvard Glee Club, and later at the Berlin Musikhochschule and at Princeton (MFA 1963). He is an Institute Professor of music at the Massachusetts Institute of Technology. He is a former student of Walter Piston and Roger Sessions. His works include several symphonies, string quartets, and concerti for violin, viola, and double bass.

He won the Pulitzer Prize for music in 1987 for The Flight into Egypt, and in 1989 he received a $305,000 MacArthur Fellowship. In 1998 he was awarded the 4th Annual Heinz Award in the Arts and Humanities. He was awarded the Harvard Arts Medal in 2000. In 2006 a recording of his Mottetti di Montale was nominated for a Grammy Award in the Best Small Ensemble Performance category.

The Metropolitan Opera commissioned Harbison's The Great Gatsby to celebrate James Levine's 25th anniversary with the company. The opera premiered on December 20, 1999, conducted by Levine and starring Jerry Hadley, Dawn Upshaw, Susan Graham, Lorraine Hunt Lieberson, Mark Baker, Dwayne Croft, and Richard Paul Fink.

In 1991, Harbison was the music director of the Ojai Music Festival in conjunction with Peter Maxwell Davies.

Harbison was jointly commissioned by the Pontifical Council for the Promotion of Christian Unity and the Pontifical Council for Inter-religious Dialogue to write a piece for the Papal Concert of Reconciliation. The event was co-officiated by the Chief Rabbi of Rome, Rav Elio Toaff, the Imam of the Mosque of Rome, Abdulawahab Hussein Gomaa, and Pope John Paul II. Abraham, a six-minute composition for brass and antiphonal choirs, had its world premiere on January 17, 2004, performed by members of the Pittsburgh Symphony Orchestra and a choir made up of members of the Mendelssohn Choir of Pittsburgh, the London Philharmonic Choir, the Krakow Philharmonic Choir, and the Ankara Polyphonic Choir, under the baton of Sir Gilbert Levine.

Harbison was previously the principal guest conductor for Emmanuel Music in Boston; after founding director Craig Smith's death in 2007, Harbison was named Acting Artistic Director.

When asked in 1990 for his "artistic credo", Harbison replied: "to make each piece different from the others, to find clear, fresh large designs, to reinvent traditions".

He is married to violinist Rose Mary Harbison (née Pederson).

Discography (incomplete)
Mirabai Songs / Variations (1987). Northeastern Records NR 230-CD. Performed by Janice Felty, mezzo-soprano, Collage New Music Ensemble, conducted by John Harbison — Rose Mary Harbison, violin; David Satz, clarinet; Ursula Oppens, piano. Tracks 1-6: Mirabai Songs, text from Mirabai Versions by Robert Bly. Tracks 7-10: Variations, for violin, clarinet, and piano. Track listing:
I. It's True, I Went to the Market
II. All I Was Doing Was Breathing
III. Why Mira Can't Go Back to Her Old House
IV. Where Did You Go?
V. The Clouds
VI. Don't Go, Don't Go
Variations i–v
Variations vi–x
Variations xi–xv
Finale and Epilogue
The Flight into Egypt and other works by John Harbison (1990). New World Records 80395-2. Performed by The Cantata Singers and Ensemble, The Los Angeles Philharmonic New Music Group, and The Los Angeles Philharmonic Orchestra. Conducted by David Hoose, John Harbison, and André Previn. Tracks:
The Flight into Egypt, text from the King James translation of the story of the Flight into Egypt in the Gospel of Matthew
The Natural World: Prelude
Where We Must Look for Help, text from Robert Bly
On the Road Home, text from Wallace Stevens
Milkweed, text from James Wright
Concerto for Double Brass Choir and Orchestra: I. Invention on a Motif: Tempo giusto
II. Invention on a Chord: Cantabile
III. Invention on a Cadence: Molto allegro
At First Light (1998). Archetype Records 60106. Performed by Lorraine Hunt, mezzo-soprano, Dawn Upshaw, soprano, Greenleaf Chamber Players, and Metamorphosen Chamber Orchestra, conducted by Scott Yoo. Tracks:
Due Libri dei Mottetti di Montale
Snow Country
Chorale Cantata
Concerto for Oboe, Clarinet, and Strings
John Harbison: Ulysses' Bow / Samuel Chapter (2004). First Edition ASIN: B0002RQ35C. Tracks:
Ulysses' Bow ballet performed by Pittsburgh Symphony Orchestra and conducted by André Previn
Samuel Chapter performed by Susan Larson (soprano) and conducted by John Harbison
The Reawakening, String Quartet No. 3, Fantasia on a Ground, Thanks Victor (2001). Musica Omnia om0110. Lydian String Quartet, Dominique Labelle, soprano.
World Premiere Recordings: Violin Concerto, Recordare, Seven Motets (1997). Koch 3-7310-2-H1. Emmanuel Music, Craig Smith, conductor, Rose-Mary Harbison, violin.
Sessions: Symphony No. 2; Harbison: Symphony No. 2, Oboe Concerto (1994). london 443 376-2. San Francisco Symphony, Herbert Bloomstedt, conductor, William Bennet, oboe.
String Quartet No.1/String Quartet No. 2/November 19, 1828 (1992). Lydian String Quartet, Yehudi Wyner, piano.
Simple Daylight/Words from Patterson/Piano Quintet, (1999). Electra Nonesuch 79189-2. Boston Symphony Chamber Players, Gilbert Kalish, piano, Sanford Sylvan, baritone, Dawn Upshaw, soprano.
Four Psalms/Emerson (2004). New World Records 80613-2. Cantata Singers and Ensemble, David Hoose, conductor.
Mottetti di Montale (2005). Koch KIC-CD-7545. Collage New Music, David Hoose, music director, Janice Felty and Margaret Lattimore mezzo-sopranos.
 Four Songs of Solitude/Variations/Twilight Music (2003) Naxos. Daniel Blumenthal, Jannine Jansen, Lars Wouters van der Oudenweijer, Bernhard Krug, Spectrum Concerts Berlin.

Works

Operas

Full Moon in March (1977) – chamber opera
Winter's Tale (1979) – based on the play by William Shakespeare
The Great Gatsby (1999) – based on the 1925 novel by F. Scott Fitzgerald, commissioned by the Metropolitan Opera

Ballet

Ulysses (1983)

Orchestral

Incidental Music from The Merchant of Venice (1971), for string orchestra
Elegiac Songs (1974), for mezzo-soprano and chamber orchestra
commissioned by the Fromm Music Foundation
Diotima (1976)
commissioned by the Koussevitzky Music Foundation in the Library of Congress
Piano Concerto (1978), for piano and chamber orchestra
commissioned by the American Composers Orchestra for Robert Miller
Snow Country (1979), for oboe and string orchestra
commissioned by Dr. Maurice Pechet, New England arts patron
Violin Concerto (1978–80), for violin and chamber orchestra

written for Rose Mary Harbison
Symphony No. 1 (1981)
commissioned by the Boston Symphony Orchestra
Concerto for Oboe, Clarinet and String Orchestra (1985)
commissioned by the National Endowment of the Arts for the Toledo Symphony Orchestra, the International Chamber Soloists, the Wall Street Chamber Players, the Philadelphia College of Performing Arts, the Carnegie-Mellon University and the University of Michigan at Ann Arbor.
Remembering Gatsby (1985)
commissioned by the Atlanta Symphony Orchestra
Symphony No. 2 (1987)
commissioned by the San Francisco Symphony in celebration of the orchestra's seventy-fifth anniversary season
Concerto for Double Brass Choir and Orchestra (1988), for twelve brass soli and chamber orchestra
commissioned by the Los Angeles Philharmonic
Viola Concerto (1988), for viola and orchestra
commissioned by the New Jersey Symphony
Symphony No. 3 (1990)
commissioned by the Baltimore Symphony Orchestra
David's Fascinating Rhythm Method (1991), for chamber orchestra
commissioned by the Baltimore Symphony Orchestra
Three City Blocks (1991), for concert band
commissioned by the concert bands of the New England Conservatory, University of Cincinnati, Florida State University, U.S. Air Force, Ohio State University, University of Michigan and University of Southern California.
Oboe Concerto (1991), for oboe and orchestra
commissioned by the San Francisco Symphony
Cello Concerto (1993), for cello and orchestra
commissioned by Yo-Yo Ma and the Chicago Symphony Orchestra
The Most Often Used Chords (1993), for chamber orchestra
commissioned by the Los Angeles Chamber Orchestra
Flute Concerto (1994), for flute and orchestra
commissioned by Ransom Wilson and the American Composers Orchestra
Olympic Dances (1996), for concert band
commissioned by the College Band Directors National Association
Partita (2001)
commissioned by the Minnesota Orchestra
Symphony No. 4 (2003)
commissioned by the Seattle Symphony
Crane Sightings (2004), for violin and string orchestra
written for Rose Mary Harbison, the composer's wife
Darkbloom: Overture for an Imagined Opera (2004)
commissioned by the Boston Symphony Orchestra
Canonical American Songbook (2005)
commissioned by the Albany Symphony Orchestra
Concerto for Bass Viol (2005), for double bass and chamber orchestra
commissioned by the International Society of Bassists
Milosz Songs (2006), for soprano and orchestra
commissioned by the New York Philharmonic for Dawn Upshaw
Rubies (after Thelonius Monk's "Ruby, My Dear") (2006)
commissioned by Gerard Schwarz and the Seattle Symphony
The Great Gatsby – Suite (2007)
commissioned by the Aspen Music Festival and School
Symphony No. 5 (2007), for mezzo-soprano, baritone soli and orchestra
commissioned by the Boston Symphony Orchestra
Mary Lou (Four Symphonic Memories of Mary Lou Williams) (2008)
commissioned by the Pittsburgh Youth Symphony
Double Concerto for Violin and Cello (2009), for violin, cello and orchestra
commissioned by the Friends of the Dresden Music Foundation for the Boston Symphony Orchestra
Closer to My Own Life (2011), for mezzo-soprano and chamber orchestra
Symphony No. 6 (2011), for mezzo-soprano and orchestra
commissioned by James Levine and the Boston Symphony Orchestra
Crossroads (2012), for soprano/mezzo-soprano, oboe and string orchestra or oboe, two violins, viola, cello and double bass
Koussevitzky Said (2012), for S.A.T.B. choir and orchestra
What Do We Make of Bach? (2018), for organ obbligato and orchestra
commissioned by Minnesota Orchestra, Seattle Symphony and Northrop at the University of Minnesota

Choral
In Spiritu: Prayer (1955), for a cappella male-voice choir
Ave Maria (1959), for a cappella S.S.A.A. choir
He Shall Not Cry (1959), for S.A. choir and organ
Five Songs of Experience (1971), for S.A.T.B. choir, two percussion and string quartet
commissioned by the Emmanuel Episcopal Church, Boston for the Cantata Singers
Music When Soft Voices Die (1966), for S.A.T.B. choir and harpsichord or organ
commissioned by the Cantata Singers
Nunc Dimittis (1975), for T.B. choir and piano
commissioned by the Harvard Glee Club
The Flower-Fed Buffaloes (1976), for baritone solo, S.S.A.T.B.B. choir and instrumental ensemble
commissioned by the New York State Bar Association
The Flight into Egypt (1986), for soprano, baritone soli, S.A.T.B. choir and chamber orchestra
commissioned by the Cantata Singers
Two Emmanuel Motets (1990), for a cappella S.A.T.B. choir
commissioned by the Emmanuel Episcopal Church, Boston
Ave Verum Corpus (1991), for a cappella S.S.A.T.B. choir
commissioned by the Emmanuel Choir, Boston and the Ojai Festival
O Magnum Mysterium (1991/92), for a cappella S.A.T.B. choir
commissioned by Saturday Evening Brass
Veni Creator Spiritus (1992), for a cappella T.B. choir
commissioned by the Rosalind Denny Lewis Music Library at the Massachusetts Institute of Technology
Communion Words (1994), for a cappella S.A.T.B. choir
Concerning Them Which Are Asleep (1994), for a cappella S.S.A.T.B.B. choir
Emerson (1995), a cappella S.A.T.B. double choir
commissioned by the University of Wisconsin–Madison School of Music for their 100th anniversary (1995)
Juste Judex (1995), for mezzo-soprano, baritone soli, S.A.T.B. choir and orchestra
commissioned as part of the Requiem of Reconciliation
Evening (Der Abend) (1997), for a cappella S.A.T.B. double choir
Four Psalms (1998), for S.A.T.B. soli, S.A.T.B. choir and orchestra
commissioned by the Israeli Consulate for the Chicago Symphony
Psalm 137 (1998), for a cappella S.A.T.B. choir
Requiem (1985–2002), for S.A.T.B. soli, S.A.T.B. choir and orchestra
commissioned by the Boston Symphony Orchestra
We do not live to ourselves (2002), for a cappella S.A.T.B. choir
Abraham (2004), for double S.A.T.B. choir and two large brass choirs
commissioned for the Papal Concert of Reconciliation in Rome for the Ankara Polyphonic Choir, London Philharmonic Choir, Krakow Philharmonic Choir and musicians from the Pittsburgh Symphony
Charity Never Faileth (2004), for a cappella S.A.T.B. choir
Let Not Your Heart Be Troubled (2004), for a cappella S.A.T.B. choir
My Little Children, Let Us Not Love in Word (2004), for a cappella S.A.T.B. choir
commissioned by the Cantata Singers
But Mary Stood (2005), for soprano solo, choir and string orchestra
commissioned by the Cantata Singers
Umbrian Landscape with Saint (2005), for optional choir and chamber ensemble
commissioned by the Chicago Chamber Musicians
A Clear Midnight (2007), for T.T.B.B. choir and five strings
commissioned by the Georgina Joshi Foundation for Indiana University and the Pro Arte Singers
Madrigal (2007), for a cappella S.A.T.B.B. choir
commissioned by the New York Virtuoso Singers
The Pool (2010), for S.A.T.B. choir and piano
Koussevitzky Said: Choral Scherzo with Orchestra (2012), for S.A.T.B. choir and orchestra: commissioned by the Boston Symphony Orchestra in Celebration of the 75th Anniversary of the Tanglewood Music Festival
The Supper at Emmaus (2013), for S.A.T.B. choir, two oboes, bassoon, organ and string orchestra
Never Time (2015), for jazz choir and jazz band
Psalm 116 (2016), for a cappella S.S.S.A.A.A.T.T.T.B.B.B. choir
commissioned by Chanticleer

Chamber

Andante con moto (1955), for cello and piano
Duo (1961), for flute and piano
Canzonetta (1962), for bassoon quartet
Confinement (1965), for twelve players
written for the Contemporary Chamber Ensemble and Arthur Weisberg
Four Preludes from "December Music" (1967), for flexible instrumentation: 3 instruments – flute, violin, oboe, clarinet
Serenade (1968), for flute, clarinet, bass clarinet, violin, viola and cello
Piano Trio (1969), for violin, cello and piano
Bermuda Triangle (1970), for tenor saxophone, electric organ and amplified cello
commissioned by the New York Camerata
Die Kurze (1970), for flute, clarinet, piano, violin and cello
commissioned by the New York Composer's Forum
Snow Country (1979), for oboe and string quintet
commissioned by Dr. Maurice Pechet
Wind Quintet (1979), for flute, oboe, clarinet, horn and bassoon
commissioned by the Naumburg Foundation
Due Libri (1980), for mezzo-soprano and nine players
commissioned by the New York Philomusica and Robert Levin
Mottetti di Montale (1980), for mezzo-soprano and nine players or piano
commissioned by New York Philomusica, the University of Oregon and Collage
Organum for Paul Fromm (1981), for glockenspiel, marimba, vibraphone, harpsichord and piano
commissioned by the University of Chicago
Piano Quintet (1981), for two violins, viola, cello and piano
commissioned by the Santa Fe Chamber Music Festival
Exequien for Calvin Simmons (1982), for seven players
Overture: Michael Kohlhaas (1982), for twelve brass
Variations (1982), for clarinet, violin and piano
commissioned by Frank Taplin for the Token Creek Festival, Wisconsin
String Quartet No. 1 (1985), for two violins, viola and cello
commissioned by the Cleveland Quartet
Twilight Music (1985), for horn, violin and piano
commissioned by the Chamber Music Society of Lincoln Center
Fanfare for Foley's (1986), for twelve brass and two percussion
Music for Eighteen Winds (1986)
commissioned by the Massachusetts Institute of Technology
String Quartet No. 2 (1987), for two violins, viola and cello
Two Chorale Preludes for Advent (from "Christmas Vespers") (1987), for brass quintet
Fantasy-Duo (1988), for violin and piano
commissioned by the McKim Fund in the Library of Congress for David Abel and Julie Steinberg
Little Fantasy on "The Twelve Days of Christmas" (1988), for brass quintet
November 19, 1828 (1988), for violin, viola, cello and piano
commissioned by the National Endowment for the Arts for the Atlanta Chamber Players, the Da Capo Chamber Players and Voices of Change
Fanfares and Reflection (1990), for two violins
commissioned by Token Creek Festival
Fourteen Fabled Folksongs (1992), for violin and marimba
Prelude (1993), for cello and piano
String Quartet No. 3 (1993), for two violins, viola and cello
San Antonio (1994), for alto saxophone and piano
Thanks Victor (1994), for string quartet
commissioned by the Lydian Quartet
Trio Sonata (1994), for three clarinets or three saxophones or oboe, cor Anglais and bassoon or string trio
Fanfare for a Free Man (1997), for three oboes and three bassoons
La Primavera di Sottoripa (1998), for mezzo-soprano and nine players
commissioned by the Santa Fe Chamber Music Festival
North and South (2000), for soprano/mezzo-soprano and seven players
written for Lorraine Hunt Lieberson
Six American Painters (2000), for flute/oboe, violin, viola and cello
commissioned by the radio station WGUC Cincinnati
Chaconne (2001), for flute, clarinet, violin, cello and piano
String Quartet No. 4 (2002), for two violins, viola and cello
commissioned by the Santa Fe Chamber Music Festival
Cucaraccia and Fugue (2003), for four violas
commissioned by the Token Creek Festival
Trio II. (2003), for violin, cello and piano
commissioned by the Harris Foundation, Chamber Music America and Meet the Composer for the Amelia Trio
Songs America Loves to Sing (2004), for flute, clarinet, piano, violin and cello
commissioned by the Atlanta Chamber Players and the Da Capo Chamber Players
Abu Ghraib (2006), for cello and piano
commissioned by the Rockport Festival for Rhonda Rider and David Deveau
Deep Dances (2006), for cello and double bass
commissioned by the Bank of America Celebrity Series for Rebecca Rice
French Horn Suite (2006), for four French horns
commissioned by the Massachusetts Institute of Technology
Cortège: in memoriam Donald Sur (2008), for percussion sextet
commissioned by the New England Conservatory Percussion Ensemble
Diamond Watch (2010), for two pianos
commissioned by the Massachusetts Institute of Technology and Priscilla Myrick Diamond for Peter Diamond and pianist Robert Levin
Finale, Presto (2011), for two violins, viola and cello
Sonata No. 1 (2011), for violin and piano
String Quartet No. 5 (2011), for two violins, viola and cello
written in honor of the 100th anniversary of the Pro Arte Quartet
Crossroads (2012), for soprano or mezzo-soprano, oboe, two violins, viola, cello and double bass or oboe and string orchestra
Invention on a Theme of William Shakespeare (2012), for solo cello, two violins, viola and double bass
The Right to Pleasure (2013), for mezzo-soprano, two violins, viola, cello and double bass or piano
String Trio (2013), for violin, viola and cello
commissioned by Camerata Pacifica audience members
The Cross of Snow (2015), for countertenor and four violas da gamba or two violins, viola and cello
commissioned by William John Wartmann in memory of Joyce Frances Wartmann
Presences (2015), for cello solo, two violins, viola, cello and double bass
commissioned by Charles Felsenthal in memory of David Anderson
Mark the Date (2016), for flute and piano
commissioned by Asadour Santourian
The Nine Rasas (2016), for clarinet, viola and piano
String Quartet No. 6 (2016), for two violins, viola and cello
commissioned by the Lark Quartet, Telegraph Quartet and Tanglewood Music Center
IF (monodrama for soprano and ensemble) (2017), for soprano and eight players
commissioned by Boston Musica Viva for the 50th anniversary of Boston Musica Viva, the Santa Fe Chamber Music Festival and the Chamber Music Society of Lincoln Center
Sonata for Viola and Piano (2018), for viola and piano
commissioned anonymously in honor of John Harbison's 80th birthday

Vocal

Autumnal (1964), for alto and piano
Cantata III (1968), for soprano, two violins, viola and cello
Moments of Vision (1975), for soprano and tenor doubling handbells, alto recorder/sopranino recorder/bass recorder/alto krumhorn, lute/hurdy-gurdy/dulcimer and gamba
Samuel Chapter (1978), for high voice (woman or boy) and six players
Due Libri (1980), for mezzo-soprano and nine players
commissioned by the New York Philomusica and Robert Levin
Mottetti di Montale (1980), for mezzo-soprano and nine players or piano
commissioned by New York Philomusica, the University of Oregon and Collage
Mirabai Songs (1982), for soprano/mezzo-soprano and eight players or piano
December 1 (1995), for mezzo-soprano and chamber orchestra
La Primavera di Sottoripa (1998), for mezzo-soprano and nine players
commissioned by the Santa Fe Chamber Music Festival
Il Saliscendi Bianco (1999), for mezzo-soprano and nine players
commissioned by Collage
North and South (2000), for soprano/mezzo-soprano and seven players
written for Lorraine Hunt Lieberson
Ain't Goin' to Study War No More (2003), for baritone, two trumpets, snare drum and string orchestra
Milosz Songs (2006), for soprano and orchestra
Closer to My Own Life (2011), for mezzo-soprano and chamber orchestra
Crossroads (2012), for soprano or mezzo-soprano, oboe, two violins, viola, cello and double bass or oboe and string orchestra
commissioned by the New York Philharmonic for Dawn Upshaw
Seven Poems of Lorine Niedecker (2015), for soprano and piano
composed in honor of the Tanglewood Music Center's 75th anniversary
IF (monodrama for soprano and ensemble) (2017), for soprano and eight players
commissioned by Boston Musica Viva in honor of the 50th Anniversary of Boston Musica Viva, the Santa Fe Chamber Music Festival, and the Chamber Music Society of Lincoln Center

Solo
Sonata for Viola Alone (1961)
Amazing Grace (1972), for oboe
commissioned by oboist Philip West
Four Occasional Pieces (1978), for piano
written for André Previn, the Santa Fe Chamber Music Festival and in memory of John Boros, respectively
Parody-Fantasia (1980), for piano
adapted from December Music
Four Songs of Solitude (1985), for violin
written for the composer's wife, Rose Mary Harbison
Four More Occasional Pieces (1987), for piano
written for Joan Tower, Harriet Thiele, Rose Mary Harbison and Milo Feinberg, respectively
Sonata No. 1 – In Memoriam Roger Sessions (1987), for piano
commissioned by the National Endowment for the Arts for Robert Shannon, Ursula Oppens and Alan Feinberg
Suite (1993), for cello
Trio Sonata (1994), for piano or harpsichord or fortepiano or electric keyboard
commissioned by the Massachusetts Institute of Technology
Gatsby Etudes (1999), for piano
A Violist's Notebook, Book 1 (1998–2000), for viola
Sonata No. 2 (2001), for piano
commissioned by G. Schirmer Associated Music for Robert Levin, to whom the work is dedicated
A Violist's Notebook, Book 2 (2002), for viola
Montale Sketches (2002), for piano
after three poems by Eugenio Montale
Ten Micro-Waltzes (2004), for piano
Leonard Stein Anagrams (2009)
written for Leonard Stein
For Violin Alone (2014), for violin
commissioned by 92nd Street Y
Painting the Flowers Blue (2015), for violin
A Bag of Tails (2016), for piano
Nocturne (2018), for piano
commissioned in honor of Linda Reichert’s tenure as Artistic Director of Network for New Music
Passage (2019), for piano
Suite for Solo Violin, on soggetti cavati (2019), for violin

References

Further reading
Harbison, John. "Six Tanglewood Talks (1, 2, 3)." Perspectives of New Music, 23, no. 2 (Spring–Summer 1985): 12–22.
Harbison, John. "Six Tanglewood Talks (4, 5, 6)." Perspectives of New Music, 24, no. 1 (Autumn–Winter 1985): 46–60.
Harbison, John. "Symmetries and the New Tonality." Contemporary Music Review, 6, no. 2 (1992): 71–79.

External links
Profile, Wise Music Classical
Harbison bio at MIT
Art of the States: Exploded View #1 podcast of John Harbison discussing his String Quartet No. 3 (1993)
Del Sol Quartet: Tear includes Harbison's Fantasia from Quartet No. 2 performed by Del Sol Quartet
Interview with John Harbison, June 13, 1991

1938 births
20th-century classical composers
21st-century American composers
21st-century classical composers
American classical composers
American male classical composers
American opera composers
Harvard University alumni
Living people
MacArthur Fellows
Male opera composers
MIT School of Humanities, Arts, and Social Sciences faculty
Members of the American Academy of Arts and Letters
People from Orange, New Jersey
Pulitzer Prize for Music winners
Pupils of Roger Sessions
Pupils of Walter Piston
20th-century American composers
Music & Arts artists
20th-century American male musicians
21st-century American male musicians
Albany Records artists